The Catholic Church in Vietnam is part of the worldwide Catholic Church, under the spiritual leadership of bishops in Vietnam who are in communion with the pope in Rome. Vietnam has the fifth largest Catholic population in Asia, after the Philippines, India, China and Indonesia. There are about 7 million Catholics in Vietnam, representing 7.0% of the total population. There are 27 dioceses (including three archdioceses) with 2,228 parishes and 2,668 priests. The main liturgical rites employed in Vietnam are those of the Latin Church.

History

Early periods

The first Catholic missionaries visited Vietnam from Portugal and Spain in the 16th century. The earliest missions did not bring impressive results. Only after the arrival of Jesuits in the first decades of the 17th century did Christianity begin to establish its positions within the local populations in both domains of Đàng Ngoài (Tonkin) and Đàng Trong (Cochinchina). These missionaries were mainly Italians, Portuguese, and Japanese. Two priests, Francesco Buzomi and Diogo Carvalho, established the first Catholic community in Hội An in 1615. Between 1627 and 1630, Avignonese Alexandre de Rhodes and Portuguese Pero Marques converted more than 6,000 people in Tonkin.

In the 17th century, Jesuit missionaries including Francisco de Pina, Gaspar do Amaral, Antonio Barbosa, and de Rhodes developed an alphabet for the Vietnamese language, using the Latin script with added diacritic marks. This writing system continues to be used today, and is called chữ Quốc ngữ (literally "national language script"). Meanwhile, the traditional chữ Nôm, in which Girolamo Maiorica was an expert, was the main script conveying Catholic faith to Vietnamese until the late 19th century.

Since the late 17th century, French missionaries of the Foreign Missions Society and Spanish missionaries of the Dominican Order were gradually taking the role of evangelization in Vietnam. Other missionaries active in pre-modern Vietnam were Franciscans (in Cochinchina), Italian Dominicans & Discalced Augustinians (in Eastern Tonkin), and those sent by the Propaganda Fide.

Missionaries and the Nguyễn

The French missionary priest and Bishop of Adraa Pigneau de Behaine played a key role in Vietnamese history towards the end of the 18th century. He had come to southern Vietnam to evangelize. In 1777, the Tây Sơn brothers killed the ruling Nguyễn lords. Nguyễn Ánh was the most senior member of the family to have survived, and he fled into the Mekong Delta region in the far south, where he met Pigneau. Pigneau became Nguyễn Ánh's confidant. Pigneau reportedly hoped that by playing a substantial role in helping Ánh attain victory, he would be in position to gain important concessions for the Catholic Church in Vietnam and helping its expansion throughout Southeast Asia. From then on he became a politician and military strategist.

At one stage during the civil war, the Nguyễn were in trouble, so Pigneau was dispatched to seek French aid. He was able to recruit a band of French volunteers. Pigneau and other missionaries acted as business agents for Nguyễn Ánh, purchasing munitions and other military supplies. Pigneau also served as a military advisor and de facto foreign minister until his death in 1799. From 1794, Pigneau took part in all campaigns. He organized the defense of Diên Khánh when it was besieged by a numerically vastly superior Tây Sơn army in 1794. Upon Pigneau's death, Gia Long's funeral oration described the Frenchman as "the most illustrious foreigner ever to appear at the court of Cochinchina".

By 1802, when Nguyễn Ánh conquered all of Vietnam and declared himself Emperor Gia Long, the Catholic Church in Vietnam had three dioceses as follows:
 Diocese of Eastern Tonkin: 140,000 members, 41 Vietnamese priests, 4 missionary priests and 1 bishop.
 Diocese of Western Tonkin: 120,000 members, 65 Vietnamese priests, 46 missionary priests and 1 bishop.
 Diocese of Central and Southern Cochinchina: 60,000 members, 15 Vietnamese priests, 5 missionary priests and 1 bishop.

Gia Long tolerated the Catholic faith of his French allies and permitted unimpeded missionary activities out of respect to his benefactors. The missionary activities were dominated by the Spanish in Tonkin and the French in the central and southern regions. At the time of his death, there were six European bishops in Vietnam. The population of Christians was estimated at 300,000 in Tonkin and 60,000 in Cochinchina.

Later Nguyễn dynasty

The peaceful coexistence of Catholicism alongside the classical Confucian system of Vietnam was not to last. Gia Long himself was Confucian in outlook. As Crown Prince Nguyễn Phúc Cảnh had already died, it was assumed that Cảnh's son would succeed Gia Long as emperor, but, in 1816, Nguyễn Phúc Đảm, the son of Gia Long's second wife, was appointed instead. Gia Long chose him for his strong character and his deeply conservative aversion to Westerners, whereas Cảnh's lineage had converted to Catholicism and were reluctant to maintain their Confucian traditions such as ancestor worship.

Lê Văn Duyệt, the Vietnamese general who helped Nguyễn Ánh—the future Emperor Gia Long—put down the Tây Sơn rebellion, unify Vietnam and establish the Nguyễn dynasty, and many of the high-ranking mandarins opposed Gia Long's succession plan. Duyệt and many of his southern associates tended to be favourable to Christianity, and supported the installation of Nguyễn Cảnh's descendants on the throne. As a result, Duyệt was held in high regard by the Catholic community. According to the historian Mark McLeod, Duyệt was more concerned with military rather than social needs, and was thus more interested in maintaining strong relations with Europeans so that he could acquire weapons from them, rather than worrying about the social implications of westernization. Gia Long was aware that Catholic clergy were opposed to the installation of Minh Mạng because they favored a Catholic monarch (Cảnh's son) who would grant them favors.

Minh Mạng began to place restrictions on Catholicism. He enacted "edicts of interdiction of the Catholic religion" and condemned Christianity as a "heterodox doctrine". He saw the Catholics as a possible source of division, especially as the missionaries were arriving in Vietnam in ever-increasing numbers. Duyệt protected Vietnamese Catholic converts and westerners from Minh Mạng's policies by disobeying the emperor's orders.

Minh Mạng issued an imperial edict, that ordered missionaries to leave their areas and move to the imperial city, ostensibly because the palace needed translators, but in order to stop the Catholics from evangelizing. Whereas the government officials in central and northern Vietnam complied, Duyệt disobeyed the order and Minh Mạng was forced to bide his time. The emperor began to slowly wind back the military powers of Duyệt, and increased this after his death. Minh Mạng ordered the posthumous humiliation of Duyệt, which resulted in the desecration of his tomb, the execution of sixteen relatives, and the arrests of his colleagues. Duyệt's son, Lê Văn Khôi, along with the southerners who had seen their and Duyệt's power curtailed, revolted against Minh Mạng.

Khôi declared himself in favour of the restoration of the line of Prince Cảnh. This choice was designed to obtain the support of Catholic missionaries and Vietnamese Catholics, who had been supporting the Catholic line of Prince Cảnh. Lê Văn Khôi further promised to protect Catholicism. In 1833, the rebels took over southern Vietnam, with Catholics playing a large role. 2,000 Vietnamese Catholic troops fought under the command of Father Nguyễn Văn Tâm.

The rebellion was suppressed after three years of fighting. The French missionary Father Joseph Marchand, of the Paris Foreign Missions Society was captured in the siege, and had been supporting Khôi, and asked for the help of the Siamese army, through communications to his counterpart in Siam, Father Jean-Louis Taberd. This showed the strong Catholic involvement in the revolt and Father Marchand was executed.

The failure of the revolt had a disastrous effect on the Christians of Vietnam. New restrictions against Christians followed, and demands were made to find and execute remaining missionaries. Anti-Catholic edicts to this effect were issued by Minh Mạng in 1836 and 1838. In 1836–37 six missionaries were executed: Ignacio Delgado, Dominico Henares, José Fernández, François Jaccard, Jean-Charles Cornay, and Bishop Pierre Borie. The villages of Christians were destroyed and their possessions confiscated. Families were broken apart. Christians were branded on the forehead with tà đạo, “false religion.” It is believed that between 130,000 and 300,000 Christians died in the various persecutions. The 117 proclaimed saints represent the many unknown martyrs.

Catholicism in South Vietnam (1954–1975)

From 1954 to 1975, Vietnam was split into North and South Vietnam. During a 300-day period where the border between the two sides was temporarily open, many North Vietnamese Catholics fled southward out of fear that they would be persecuted by the Viet Minh.

In a country where Buddhists were the majority, President Ngô Đình Diệm's policies generated claims of religious bias even though he sponsored and supported many Buddhist organizations, and Buddhism flourished under his regime. As a member of the Catholic minority, he pursued policies which antagonized the Buddhist majority. The government was biased towards Catholics in public service and military promotions, and the allocation of land, business favors and tax concessions. Diệm once told a high-ranking officer, forgetting the man was from a Buddhist background, "Put your Catholic officers in sensitive places. They can be trusted." Many officers in the Army of the Republic of Vietnam converted to Catholicism to better their prospects. The distribution of firearms to village self-defense militias intended to repel Việt Cộng guerrillas saw weapons only given to Catholics. Some Catholic priests ran their own private armies, and in some areas forced conversions, looting, shelling and demolition of pagodas occurred. 

Some villages converted en masse in order to receive aid or avoid being forcibly resettled by Diệm's regime. The Catholic Church was the largest landowner in the country, and its holdings were exempt from reform and given extra property acquisition rights, while restrictions against Buddhism remained in force. Catholics were also de facto exempt from the corvée labor that the government obliged all citizens to perform; U.S. aid was disproportionately distributed to Catholic majority villages. In 1959, Diem dedicated his country to the Virgin Mary.

The white and gold "Vatican flag" was regularly flown at all major public events in South Vietnam. The newly constructed Huế and Đà Lạt universities were placed under Catholic authority to foster a Catholic-influenced academic environment.

In May 1963, in the central city of Huế, where Diệm's elder brother Pierre Martin Ngô Đình Thục was archbishop, Buddhists were prohibited from displaying the Buddhist flag during the sacred Buddhist Vesak celebrations. A few days earlier, Catholics were encouraged to fly religious—that is, papal—flags at the celebration in honour of Thục's anniversary as bishop. Both actions technically violated a rarely enforced law which prohibited the flying of any flag other than the national one, but only the Buddhist flags were prohibited in practice. This prompted a protest against the government, which was violently suppressed by Diệm's forces, resulting in the killing of nine civilians. This in turn led to a mass campaign against Diệm's government during what became known as the Buddhist crisis. Diệm was later deposed and assassinated on 2 November 1963. Recent scholarships reveal significant understandings about Diệm's own independent agenda and political philosophy. The Personalist Revolution under his regime promoted religious freedom and diversity to oppose communism's atheism. However, this policy itself ultimately enabled religious activists to threaten the state that supported their religious liberty.

Present time

The first Vietnamese bishop, Jean-Baptiste Nguyễn Bá Tòng, was consecrated in 1933 at St. Peter's Basilica by Pope Pius XI. The Catholic Bishops' Conference of Vietnam was founded in 1980. In 1976, the Holy See made Archbishop Joseph-Marie Trịnh Như Khuê the first Vietnamese cardinal. Joseph-Marie Cardinal Trịnh Văn Căn in 1979, and Paul-Joseph Cardinal Phạm Đình Tụng in 1994, were his successors. The well known Vietnamese Cardinal Francis Xavier Nguyễn Văn Thuận, who was imprisoned by the Communist regime from 1975 to 1988 and spent nine years in solitary confinement, was nominated secretary of the Pontifical Council for Justice and Peace, and made its president in 1998. On 21 February 2001, he was elevated to the College of Cardinals by Pope John Paul II. Vietnamese Catholics who died for their faith from 1533 to the present day were canonized in 1988 by John Paul II as "Vietnamese Martyrs". On 26 March 1997, the beatification process for the Redemptorist brother Marcel Nguyễn Tân Văn was opened by Cardinal Nguyễn Văn Thuận in the diocese of Belley-Ars, France.

There have been meetings between leaders of Vietnam and the Vatican, including a visit by Vietnam's Prime Minister Nguyễn Tấn Dũng to the Vatican to meet Pope Benedict XVI on 25 January 2007. Official Vatican delegations have been traveling to Vietnam almost every year since 1990 for meetings with its government authorities and to visit Catholic dioceses. In March 2007, a Vatican delegation visited Vietnam and met with local officials. In October 2014, Pope Francis met with Prime Minister Nguyễn Tấn Dũng in Rome. The sides continued discussions about the possibility of establishing normal diplomatic relations, but have not provided a specific schedule for the exchange of ambassadors. The Pope would again meet Vietnamese leader Trần Đại Quang and his associates in Vatican in 2016.

Vietnam remains as the only Asian communist country to have an unofficial representative of the Vatican in the country and has held official to unofficial meetings with the Vatican's representatives both in Vietnam and the Holy See—which does not exist in China, North Korea and Laos—due to long and historical relations between Vietnam and the Catholic Church dating to before the period of French colonization in Southeast Asia. These relations have improved in recent years, as the Holy See announced they will have a permanent representative in Vietnam in 2018.

Restrictions on Catholic life in Vietnam and the government's desired involvement in the nomination of bishops remain obstacles in bilateral dialogues. In March 2007, Thaddeus Nguyễn Văn Lý (b. 1946), a dissident Catholic priest, was sentenced by Vietnamese court in Huế to eight years in prison on grounds of "anti-government activities". Nguyen, who had already spent 14 of the past 24 years in prison, was accused of being a founder of a pro-democracy movement Bloc 8406 and a member of the Progression Party of Vietnam.

On 16 September 2007, the fifth anniversary of the Cardinal Nguyễn Văn Thuận's death, the Catholic Church began the beatification process for him. Benedict XVI expressed "profound joy" at the news of the official opening of the beatification cause. Vietnamese Catholics reacted positively to the news of the beatification. In December 2007, thousands of Vietnamese Catholics marched in procession to the former apostolic nunciature in Hanoi and prayed there twice aiming to return the property to the local church. The building was located at a historic Buddhist site until it was confiscated by the French authorities and given to Catholics, before the communist North Vietnamese government confiscated it from the Catholic Church in 1959. This was the first mass civil action by Vietnamese Catholics since the 1970s. Later the protests were supported by Catholics in Hồ Chí Minh City and Hà Đông, who made the same demands for their respective territories. In February 2008, the governments promised to return the building to the Catholic Church. However, in September 2008, the authorities changed their position and decided to demolish the building to create a public park.

Dioceses

There are 27 dioceses, including three archdioceses, in a total of three ecclesiastical provinces. The archdioceses are:
 Archdiocese (Metropolitan) of Hanoi
 Archdiocese (Metropolitan) of Huế
 Archdiocese (Metropolitan) of Ho Chi Minh City (former Saigon)

See also
Vietnamese Martyrs
Our Lady of La Vang
Đọc kinh (Vietnamese cantillation)
Ngắm Mùa Chay (Vietnamese Lenten meditation)  
Holy See–Vietnam relations

Citations

Bibliography

Specialized sources

Monographs 
 
 
 
 
 
  
 

Doctoral theses:

Book chapters 
 
 
 
 
 
 
  Online resource.

Journal articles

Supplementary sources 

  
  
  
 
 
 
 
 
 

  Viện Nghiên cứu Tôn giáo, Viện Hàn lâm Khoa học Xã hội Việt Nam.
  Institute for Religious Studies, Vietnam Academy of Social Sciences.

External links
Catholic Church in Vietnam on GCatholic
Catholic Church in Vietnam on Catholic-Hierarchy
"Catholic processions in Vietnam" photo collection

 
Vietnam
Vietnam